the second USS Fearless (AMc-80) was an Accentor-class coastal minesweeper acquired by the U.S. Navy.

World War II service 

No data available.

Reclassified as a dive tender 

Fearless was reclassified YDT-5 on 15 February 1943.

Deactivation 

Fearless was sunk as a target in 1973.

The Fearless is in 80 feet of water lying on her keel 800 yards North of Great Harbour Peter Island in the British Virgin Islands.

References

External links 
 NavSource Online: Mine Warfare Vessel Photo Archive - YDT-5 - ex-Fearless (AMc 80)
 USS Fearless (AMc-80)
 AMc-80 USS Fearless

 

Accentor-class minesweepers
World War II minesweepers of the United States
1941 ships